Parmar  (Gujarati: પરમાર)  is an Indian surname. Notable people bearing the name include:
 Abha Parmar (born 1963), Indian actress
 Arvind Parmar (born 1978), former British professional tennis player 
 Ashish Parmar (1979–2020), Indian photographer
 Atmaram Parmar, Bharatiya Janata Party politician from Gujarat
 Belinda Parmar (born 1974), British entrepreneur, campaigner and corporate activist
 Bhaljibhai Ravjibhai Parmar (1920), Indian politician
 Bharatsinh Parmar, Indian politician
 Chirag Parmar (born 1990), Indian cricketer
 Dayaram Parmar (born 1945), Indian politician
 Dinesh Parmar, Indian politician and medical doctor
 Disha Parmar (born 1994), Indian television actress and former model
 Gajendrasinh Parmar (born 1978), Indian politician
 Gopal Parmar, Indian politician
 Govind Parmar, Indian politician
 Heena Parmar (born 1990), Indian actress
 Inder Singh Parmar (born 1964), Indian politician
 Inderjeet Parmar, professor of international politics
 Ishwarbhai Parmar (born 1971), Indian politician
 Jashoda Parmar, Indian women politician
 Jaspal Parmar (born 1984), Indian football player
 Jaydrathsinh Parmar (born 1964), Bharatiya Janata Party politicians from Gujarat
 Jayveer Parmar (born 1998), Indian cricketer
 Juhi Parmar (born 1980), Indian anchor, actress, presenter, singer and dancer 
 Kishan Parmar (born 1992), Indian cricketer
 Kripal Parmar (born 1959), Indian politician
 Madansingh Parmar (born 1936), Indian former cricketer
 Mahendrasinh Parmar (born 1967), Gujarati writer
 Mahesh Parmar (born 1979), Indian politician
 Manoj Parmar (born 1967), former Indian cricketer
 Mohan Parmar (born 1948), Gujarati language short story writer, novelist and critic
 Monish Parmar (born 1987), right-arm off-break bowler from India
 Mukund Parmar (born 1968), Indian former cricketer
 Natverlal Parmar (1927–2010), Indian politician
 Nilesh Parmar (born 1970), Indian former international cricketer
 Parmjeet Parmar (born 1970), New Zealand politician
 Parul Parmar (born 1973), Indian para-badminton player from Gujarat
 Pradip Parmar, Indian politician
 Pratibha Parmar (born 1955), British filmmaker- a writer, director and producer
 Raj Parmar (born 1981), British-Asian Bollywood dancer, choreographer, and television and radio personality
 Raju Parmar (born 1950), Indian politician
 Sandeep Parmar (born 1979), British women poet
 Sanjeev Parmar (born 1978), Canadian former soccer player
 Sarena Parmar, Canadian actress
 Shailesh Parmar (born 1969), Indian politician
 Talwinder Singh Parmar (1944–1992), Canadian-Sikh terrorist and religious extremist
 Vipin Singh Parmar (born 1964), Indian politician
 Vishvesh Parmar (born 1983), Indian playback singer/recording artist and composer
 Yashwant Singh Parmar (1906–1981), Indian politician
 Yusuf Parmar, Gujarat Indian National Congress politician

References

Indian surnames
Surnames of Indian origin
Gujarati-language surnames